Project Chrono is a physics engine developed by University of Wisconsin-Madison and University of Parma and members of its open source community. It supports simulating rigid and soft body dynamics, collision detection, vehicle dynamics, fluid-solid interaction, deformable terrain, and granular dynamics, among other physical systems. The latest developments are in the area of sensor simulation, robotics simulation, human-autonomous agent interaction (real-time simulation), and autonomous vehicle simulation, where the emphasis is on off-road scenarios. Parts of the code run on the GPU, multi-core CPUs, and distributed memory architectures via MPI. It is used at tens of universities, in industry, and federal research labs.

History
Project Chrono was initially developed for use as a multibody simulation tool for robotics and biomechanics applications by Alessandro Tasora while a student at the Polytechnic University of Milan. This became a joint University of Wisconsin-University of Parma project as of 2008.

The project was released under a BSD License in 2013.

In 2014 the United States Army invested  to fund the library's development over a two-year period. The project is under active development, current project sponsors include the US Army Research Office, National Science Foundation, Department of Defense, and Department of Transportation. Project Chrono is used by the US Army for simulating wheeled and tracked vehicles, and used for a NASA-sponsored project for the 2023 lunar mission of the VIPER rover.

References

External links
 
 
 

Computer physics engines
Software using the BSD license